Jigme Tshultrim  is a Bhutanese international footballer, currently playing for High Quality United. He made his first appearance for the Bhutan national football team in 2012.

References

Bhutanese footballers
Bhutan international footballers
Yeedzin F.C. players
Living people
1993 births
Association football defenders